The 1832 Newfoundland general election came after many years of agitation against the British Parliament. Newfoundland was the last British colony in North America to gain representative government.

Results by party

Member distribution
The first general election for Newfoundland was held in November, 1832. The island was divided into nine electoral districts:
 Conception Bay (4 members)
 St. John's (3 members)
 Placentia and St. Mary's (2 members)
 Bonavista Bay (1 member)
 Burin (1 member)
 Ferryland (1 member)
 Fogo (1 member)
 Fortune Bay (1 member)
 Trinity Bay (1 member)
None of the west coast of Newfoundland was represented during the 1832 general election because it fell within the jurisdiction of the French and American treaty shores. 15 seats in total, were up for election and representation to govern the affairs of the island.

Districts 
The districts were determined by settlements and landmarks along the coast, with no consideration given to areas inland. It was determined that all residents lived on or near the coast. 
The district of St. John's covered areas from Petty Harbour to Topsail. This area also took in Bell Island. 
The district of Conception Bay extended from Topsail to Bay de Verde Head. 
The district of Trinity was from Bay de Verde Head to Cape Bonavista. This area also included Random Island.
The district of Bonavista Bay extended from Cape Bonavista to Cape Freels.
The district of Fogo included the islands of Twillingate and Fogo and extended from Fogo Island to Cape St. John.
The district of Ferryland extended from Petty Harbour to Cape Race.
The district of Placentia and St. Mary's was from Cape Race to Rushoon.
The district of Burin was from Rushoon to Garnish.
The district of Fortune Bay was from Garnish to McCallum (formerly known as Bonne Bay).

Candidate requirements
Each candidate had to be male, twenty-one years or older, of sound understanding, either natural-born to the island or a lawfully naturalized British citizen, and a resident of two years standing who had occupied a dwelling as either tenant or owner. Also, no candidate could have a criminal record for any infamous or heinous crime. Voters were held to much the same restrictions as candidates except the residency requirement was reduced from two years to one.

Election 
The election was conducted over a period of two months from the day of proclamation to the last polling date of December 8, 1832. There were forty-seven polling booths located at strategic locations and not all communities had one. Except for the districts of St. John's, Conception Bay, and Bonavista, the candidates were elected by acclamation.

District of Conception Bay 
The nomination for Conception Bay was held on October 31, 1832, with the following candidates nominated for the four available seats:
 Charles Cozens of Brigus, nominated by William Innott and John McCarthy
 Peter Brown of Harbour Grace, nominated by John C. Nutall and William Molloy
 Robert Pack of Carbonear, nominated by William Dalton and William Talbot
 James Power of Carbonear, nominated by Thomas Chancey and William Bennett
 Robert J. Pinsent of Port de Grave, nominated by Robert Prowse and John Stark

After the election results of November 3, 1832, Robert Pinsent withdrew and the remaining four were declared representatives for the district.

District of St. John's 
Seven candidates offered themselves for election after the reading of the Proclamation and the Writ. Two more offered after the first polling day, which was met with some skepticism. Nominated were:
 Dr. William Carson, nominated by Newman W. Hoyles and Dr. Shea
 John Kent, nominated by Patrick Doyle and T. Beck
 William Thomas, nominated by Mr. Jennings and R. Brine
 William B. Row, nominated by Thomas Bennett and Mr. McBride
 Patrick Kough, nominated by Mr. Barron and Mr. Hogan
 Patrick Mullowney, nominated by R. Howley and M. O'Brien
 Patrick Power, nominated by Mr. Linehan and T. Flannery

(a) No voting took place on Sunday, November 11. 
(b) dropped out of the race after results of November 6. 
(c) nob - not on ballot. 
(d) not one of the original nominees.

After the results of voting on November 12, 1832, Dr. William Carson withdrew and the remaining three were declared as representatives of the District of St. John's.

At the opening of the House of Assembly on January 2, 1833, Dr. Carson petitioned the House for Patrick Kough's removal, claiming he was a government employee and ineligible. The petition was denied.

District of Bonavista 
There were two candidates for the district of Bonavista, Hugh Alexander Emerson and William Brown. After three polling stations had voted, William Brown withdrew. The returning officer, Peter LeMessurier, refused to recognize his withdrawal from the race and continued to the next polling station at Greenspond, a Brown stronghold. After those results, William Brown was declared the winner, and no voting took place at the remaining polling station at Cape Freels.

At the opening of the House of Assembly on January 2, 1833, Hugh Alexander Emerson petitioned the House for William Brown's removal due to Peter LeMessurier's actions. The petition was denied.

Results by riding 

|-
|bgcolor=whitesmoke|1. Bonavista Bay
||
|William Brown
|
|
|
|-
|bgcolor=whitesmoke|2. Burin
||
|William Hooper
|
|
|
|
|-
|bgcolor=whitesmoke|3. Conception Bay
||
|Charles Cozens
||
|Peter Brown  James Power  Robert Pack
|
|
|-
|bgcolor=whitesmoke|4. Ferryland
||
|Robert Carter
|
|
|
|-
|bgcolor=whitesmoke|5. Fortune Bay
||
|Newman Hoyles
|
|
|
|-
|bgcolor=whitesmoke|6. Placentia and St. Mary's
||
|John Martin
||
|Roger Sweetman
|
|
|-
|bgcolor=whitesmoke|7. St. John's
||
|Patrick Kough  William Thomas 
||
|John Kent
|
|
|-
|bgcolor=whitesmoke|8. Trinity Bay
||
|John Bingley Garland
|
|
|
|-
|bgcolor=whitesmoke|9. Twillingate and Fogo
||
|Thomas Bennett
|
|
|
|-

Governance 
John Bingley Garland was appointed the first Speaker of the House. Both John Bingley Garland and William Thomas were appointed to the Executive Council and resigned their seats in the House of Assembly. William Row, who ran for a seat in St. John’s, was given the seat for Trinity Bay and Dr. William Carson was given a seat for the District of St. John's.

See also 
 General elections in Newfoundland (pre-Confederation)

References

1832
1832 elections in North America
1832 elections in Canada
Pre-Confederation Newfoundland
1832 in Newfoundland
November 1832 events